The Portsmouth Parade Historic District is an area in Portsmouth, New Hampshire, which was formerly listed in the National Register of Historic Places (NRHP). The district is known locally as "The Hill", a cluster of closely spaced historic houses bounded on the north by Deer Street and the east by High Street at the northern edge of downtown Portsmouth. The grouping was created by a road widening project, from houses originally located on or near Deer Street.

History
Documents with the National Archives and Records Administration show that the district was nominated for inclusion to the NRHP in February 1972, at which time local authorities were "submitting funding requests to HUD, for which National Register status is a criteria." The district was added to the NRHP on March 24, 1972. The district was described as "an artificial entity created by the relocation of all but four of its fourteen buildings."

In June 1975, the nomination was returned by the Keeper of the Register, recommending that the buildings in the district be nominated individually. In December 1975, 13 of the 14 buildings were to be sold at auction, due to breach of mortgage conditions. Although the "return" of the nomination occurred in June 1975, National Park Service records indicate a de-listing date of 1999. A nearby retail and business complex was known as the Portsmouth Parade Office Center.

Individually listed buildings
Multiple buildings in the district are individually listed in the NRHP:

See also
National Register of Historic Places listings in Rockingham County, New Hampshire

Notes

References

Historic districts in Rockingham County, New Hampshire
Former National Register of Historic Places in New Hampshire
Portsmouth, New Hampshire
National Register of Historic Places in Portsmouth, New Hampshire